The United States national American football team represents the United States in international men's American football competitions. It is currently ranked no.1 in the IFAF. It is currently controlled by USA Football and is recognized by the International Federation of American Football (IFAF).

During the 2015 split between IFAF Paris and IFAF New York, in which IFAF Paris expelled USA Football in 2017. USA Football was replaced by the United States Federation of American Football in Paris, while New York retained USA Football as their active member.

Player eligibility
The national team was selected to encompass a cross-section of amateur football in the United States, and as such USA Football used strict criteria to select team members. This does not permit the top American football players in the United States to compete as the restrictions include:
Professionals from any NFL team were ineligible
Player must have graduated from college—current college players were ineligible
All levels of NCAA and NAIA athletics were required to be represented, not just FBS

These criteria are applied to make international tournaments more competitive.

IFAF World Championship

2007

The United States competed for the first time in the 2007 IFAF World Cup. The team's first ever game was a 77–0 win over South Korea in the first round of the tournament. Team USA defense set an IFAF all-time tournament record in holding South Korea to minus-31 yards in total offense, as well as the record for fewest rushing yards allowed with minus-47. In the second round the USA defeated Germany 33–7. They played Japan on July 15 for the championship. Japan was making their third appearance in the finals, winning the previous two World Championships. Japan took a 17–10 lead with seven minutes and seven seconds left in regulation. University of Arizona quarterback Adam Austin guided Team USA with an 11-play, 80-yard drive that ended with the second 5-yard touchdown run by RB Kyle Kasperbauer, to tie the game at 17. IFAF follows the overtime system used by the NCAA, and both teams scored field goals with their first possession. In the second overtime, Japan got the ball first but missed a 34-yard field goal attempt. Team USA then reached Japan's 6-yard line. On 4th and one, Craig Coffin kicked the game winning 22-yard field goal, with the final score at 23–20. University of Nebraska-Omaha running back Kyle Kasperbauer was named MVP of the game after scoring two touchdowns and running for 54 yards on 15 carries. Austin finished 12 of 25 for 109 yards, with no TD's, and one interception. Former Williams player Jon Drenckhahn was the top receiver, catching 5 passes for 40 yards.

The team included players representing all levels of college football, with 13 from NCAA Division I FBS, 12 from NCAA Division I FCS, 10 from NCAA Division II, 9 from NCAA Division III and 1 former NAIA player.

2011

The head coach of Team USA was Mel Tjeerdsma of Northwest Missouri State University, with Larry Kehres the offensive coordinator and Lou Tepper the defensive coordinator. Players on the team were announced on the official Team USA Facebook on April 28, 2011. On July 8, Team USA played its 1st game, defeating Australia 61–0. After beating Mexico on July 11, the team qualified for its 2nd consecutive World Cup gold medal game. On July 16, USA defeated Canada 50–7 to claim its 2nd consecutive World Championship.

The United States routed Canada 50–7 in the gold medal game of the 2011 IFAF Senior World Championship. The 20,000 fans in attendance at Ernst Happel Stadium in Vienna, Austria, set a record for an IFAF Championship game. The game was never close, with Team USA leading 37–7 at halftime. Team USA dominated the rushing game, outgaining Canada 247–48, with four players scoring touchdowns on the ground. While Henry Harris led the way for the Americans on the ground, with 114 yards on 15 carries and a TD, Mount Union RB Nate Kmic was the only American to score two touchdowns on the day and was named tournament MVP. University of Colorado quarterback Cody Hawkins was 13 of 21 for 161 yards and 2 TD passes. Ricardo Lenhart (Otterbein) led the receivers, with 3 catches for 63 yards. The U.S. defense recorded four sacks, and Jordan Lake caught two interceptions.

2015

The U.S. Men's National Team is led by former Boise State and Colorado head football coach Dan Hawkins. Hawkins was 53–11 at Boise State from 2001–05, winning four consecutive Western Athletic Conference titles. His teams compiled a 31-game WAC winning streak, the longest in conference history. The U.S. Men's National Team includes athletes from 24 states.

World Games

2017

During the 2015 split between IFAF Paris and IFAF New York, in which IFAF Paris expelled USA Football in 2017. USA Football was replaced by the United States Federation of American Football in Paris, while New York retained USA Football as their active member. Since IFAF New York was not recognized by the International Olympic Committee at the time, the United States Federation of American Football was permitted to organize the United States national American football team for the 2017 World Games.

Players, mainly professional Americans playing in Europe, were chosen for the team on May 31, 2017. Players were promised full funding from the United States Federation of American Football, however, the funding was withdrawn just days before the competition and players had to provide their own transportation to Wroclaw. As a result, most of the team withdrew from the competition and were instead replaced by volunteers who were already in Europe at the time. Most of the team arrived the day before their opening match vs the Germany national American football team. The Americans lost to Germany 13–14, in which was the first loss ever for a United States national American football team in international competition. 

The United States were able to rebound two days later and defeat the Poland national American football team 14-7 en route to a bronze medal at the 2017 World Games.

IFAF World Championship All-time Records

IFAF World Championship record

Uniforms

Game records
Most First Downs: 27 vs. Japan 7-12-15
Most Points Scored: 82 vs. France 7-16-15
Most Passing Yards: 267 Cody Hawkins vs. Mexico 7-12-11
Most Rushing Yards: 117 Aaron Wimberly vs. France 7-15-15
Most Receiving Yards: 106 Nate Kmic vs. Australia 7-8-11
Most Team Sacks: 8 vs. Mexico 7-9-15
Most Team Tackles for Loss: 18.5 vs. Mexico 7-9-15
Longest Play (Rushing): 60 Sadale Foster vs. Japan 7-12-15
Longest Play (Passing): 64 McLaughlin to Malm vs. Australia 7-8-11
Longest Play (Punt Return): 74 Awrey vs. South Korea 7-10-07
Longest Play (Kickoff Return): 84 Awrey 84 vs. South Korea 7-10-07
Longest Play (Field Goal): 46 Berkshire vs. Mexico 7-12-11
Longest Play (Interception Return): 77 Banks vs. Germany 7-10-11
Longest Play (Fumble Return): 10 Jackson vs. Germany 7-10-11
Longest Play (Blocked Punt Return Touchdown): 26 Calbert vs. Australia 7-8-11
Longest Play (Blocked Field Goal Return Touchdown): 75 Dingle vs. Germany 7-10-11

References

External links

American football in the United States
American
Men's national American football teams
1984 establishments in the United States
American football teams established in 1984